Moon Ranger is an action video game that was developed by Odyssey Software and published by Bunch Games. The player must fly through outer space, destroying meteors and aliens along the way.

References

External links
 Moon Ranger at GameFAQs

1990 video games
Action video games
Nintendo Entertainment System games
Nintendo Entertainment System-only games
North America-exclusive video games
Platform games
Science fiction video games
Side-scrolling video games
Video games developed in the United States
Unauthorized video games
Video games set on the Moon
Bunch Games games
Single-player video games